Group 1 was one of six groups of national teams competing in the group stage of the 1982 FIFA World Cup. Play began on 14 June and ended on 23 June 1982. The group consisted of four teams: Seeded team Poland, two-time World Cup winners Italy, Peru and World Cup debutants Cameroon.

Poland won the group, having achieved the only victory among the six fixtures in the group, and advanced to the second round. Italy also advanced, ahead of Cameroon, as Italy had scored the greater number of goals. Cameroon therefore exited the tournament undefeated.

Standings

Matches

Italy vs Poland

Peru vs Cameroon

Italy vs Peru

Poland vs Cameroon

Poland vs Peru

Italy vs Cameroon

References

External links
 1982 FIFA World Cup archive
 Spain 1982 FIFA Technical Report: Statistical Details of the Matches pp. 99-102

1982 FIFA World Cup
Poland at the 1982 FIFA World Cup
Italy at the 1982 FIFA World Cup
Peru at the 1982 FIFA World Cup
Cameroon at the 1982 FIFA World Cup